George Frederick Bullock (12 August 1918 – November 2006) was an English professional golfer. He died from motor neurone disease. He finished in the top-10 four times in The Open Championship: T-8 in 1938, T-7 in 1950, 8th in 1952, and T-2 in 1959.

Until late 1946 he was an assistant professional at Holyhead Golf Club on Anglesey, Wales where his father George was the professional. Aged 17, he was runner-up in the 1936 Welsh Professional Championship at Prestatyn, behind Fred Lloyd. After two years as professional at Otley Golf Club he became playing assistant professional at Royal Lytham & St Annes Golf Club and then the professional at Glasgow Golf Club in late 1950. At the end of 1955 he moved to Moortown Golf Club. He was later the club professional at Prestwick St Ninians, Caird Park Golf Club and Largs Golf Club.

He had two children: Sandra, who caddied for him in the 1959 Open, and Freida.

Results in major championships

Note: Bullock only played in The Open Championship.

NT = No tournament
CUT = missed the half-way cut
"T" indicates a tie for a place

References

English male golfers
Sportspeople from Warwickshire
Neurological disease deaths in England
Deaths from motor neuron disease
1918 births
2006 deaths